Pernety or de Pernety is a French surname. Notable people with the surname include:

Antoine-Joseph Pernety (1716-1796), French writer and spiritualist
 (1766-1856), French general; see XI Corps (Grande Armée)

French-language surnames